Grand Ayatollah Muhammad Husayn Fadlallah (also Sayyed Muhammad Hussein Fadl-Allāh; ; 16 November 1935 – 4 July 2010) was a prominent twelver Shia cleric from a Lebanese family. Born in Najaf, Iraq, Fadlallah studied Islam in Najaf before moving to Lebanon in 1952. In the following decades, he gave many lectures, engaged in intense scholarship, wrote dozens of books, founded several Islamic religious schools, and established the Mabarrat Association. Through the aforementioned association, he established a public library, a women's cultural center, and a medical clinic.

Fadlallah was sometimes called the "spiritual mentor" of Hezbollah in the media, although this was disputed by other sources. He was also the target of several assassination attempts, including the 1985 Beirut car bombing.

His death was followed by a huge turnout in Lebanon, visits by virtually all major political figures across the Lebanese spectrum, and statements of condolence from across the greater Middle East region; but it also led to controversy in the west and a denunciation in Israel.

Early life

Fadlallah was born in the Iraqi Shia shrine city of Najaf on 16 November 1935. His parents, Abdulraouf Fadlullah and al-Hajja Raoufa Hassan Bazzi, had migrated there from the village of 'Aynata in south Lebanon in 1928 to learn theology. By the time of his birth, his father was already a Muslim scholar.

Education

Fadlallah went first to a traditional school (Kuttāb) to learn the Quran and the basic skills of reading and writing. He soon left and went to a more "modern" school that was established by the publisher Jamiat Muntada Al-Nasher where he remained for two years and studied in the third and fourth elementary classes.

At these schools he began studying the religious sciences at a very young age. He started to read the Al-Ajurrumiyya when he was nine years old, and then he read Qatr al-Nada wa Bal Al-Sada (Ibn Hisham).

He completed Sutouh in which the student reads the book and listens to his teacher's explanation. He also studied the Arabic language, logic and Jurisprudence, and did not need another teacher until he studied the second part of the course known as Kifayat at Usul which he studied with an Iranian teacher named Sheikh mujtaba Al-Linkarani. He attended the so-called Bahth Al-Kharij in which the teacher does not restrict himself to a certain book but gives more or less free lectures. Fadlallah published a minor periodical before going to Lebanon. At the age of ten, he put out a handwritten literary journal with some of his friends.

Return to Lebanon 

After 21 years of studying under the prominent teachers of the Najaf religious university he concluded his studies in 1966 and returned to Lebanon. He had already visited Lebanon in 1952 where he recited a poem eulogizing Muhsin al Amin at his funeral.

In 1966 Fadlallah received an invitation from a group who had established a society called "The family of Fraternity" (جمعية أسرة التآخي Jam'iyat Usrat at-Ta'akhi) to come and live with them in the area of Naba'a in Eastern Beirut. He agreed, especially as the conditions at Najaf impelled him to leave.

In Naba'a Fadlallah began his work, by organising cultural seminars and delivering religious speeches that discussed social issues as well.

Nevertheless, Fadlallah's main concern was to continue to develop his academic work. Thus he founded a religious school called the Islamic Sharia Institute in which several students enrolled who later became prominent religious scholars including Sheikh Ragib Harb. He also established a public library, a women's cultural centre and a medical clinic.

When the Lebanese Civil War forced him to leave the area, he moved to the Southern Suburbs where he started to give priority to teaching and educating the people. He used the mosque as his centre for holding daily prayers giving lessons in Qur'anic interpretation, as well as religious and moral speeches, especially on religious occasions such as Ashura. He soon resumed his academic work and began to give daily lessons in Islamic principles, jurisprudence and morals. In 1982 Dawa unites with other Islamic Shia armed organizations (Islamic Amal, Islamic Jihad Organization, Jundallah and Imam Hussein suicide squad) to found Hezbollah.

Hezbollah connection

He has been variously attributed by the media as being the spiritual leader of Hezbollah. Al Manar said he had "inspired the leaders" of the group. It added that "From the pulpit of the Imam Rida mosque in the Bir al-Abd neighborhood, Sayyed Fadlullah's sermons gave shape to the political currents among mainly the Muslim Shiite sect [of Lebanon], from the latter half of the 1980s till the last days of his life." Other sources, such as journalist Robert Fisk, also refuted such claims that he was affiliated with the group.

Assassination attempts 

As one of the alleged leaders of Hezbollah, a status both he and the group denied he was the target of several assassination attempts, including the allegedly CIA-sponsored and funded 8 March 1985 Beirut car bombing that killed 80 people.

The blast destroyed a 7-story apartment building and a cinema, killed 80 people and wounded 256. The attack was timed to go off as worshippers were leaving Friday Prayers. Most of the dead were girls and women who had been leaving the mosque, though the ferocity of the blast "burned babies in their beds," "killed a bride buying her trousseau," and "blew away three children as they walked home from the mosque." It also "devastated the main street of the densely populated" West Beirut suburb. but Fadlallah escaped injury.

Journalist Robin Wright quotes articles in The Washington Post and The New York Times as saying that according to the CIA, those responsible for the bombing were "Lebanese intelligence personnel and other foreigners" who had been "undergoing CIA training" but that "this was not our [CIA] operation and it was nothing we planned or knew about." "Alarmed U.S. officials subsequently canceled the covert training operation" in Lebanon, according to Wright.

According to Bob Woodward, CIA director William Casey was involved in the attack, which he suggests was carried out with funding from Saudi Arabia. "In his book Woodward portrays Casey as a wily and aggressive director who made the CIA his personal instrument of foreign policy. In early 1985 Woodward reports, Casey went "off the books" to enlist Saudi help in carrying out three covert operations. One was the attempted assassination of Sheik Fadlallah, who had been linked to the bombings in Beirut. After that plot failed, Woodward writes, the Saudis offered Fadlallah a $2 million bribe to cease his terrorist attacks. He accepted, and the attacks stopped. Woodward's account of the incident was denied last week by the Saudi press agency and by Fadlallah's office." Former Lebanese warlord and statesman late Elie Hobeika was accused as one of those likely responsible for the actual operation.

During the 2006 Israel-Hezbollah war, Israeli warplanes bombed his two-story house in Beirut's southern Haret Hreik neighborhood. Fadlallah was not at home at the time of the bombing, which reduced the house to rubble.

Views 

He supported the Iranian Islamic Revolution. In his sermons, he called for armed resistance to the Israeli occupations of Lebanon, the West Bank, and the Gaza Strip, along with opposition to the existence of Israel.

He held relatively liberal views on the status of women. When he died in 2010, TIME magazine wrote about his contrarian stance:

"Fadlallah had broken with Hizballah and the toxic legacy of his early edicts. He criticized Iran's clerical rule, supported women's rights and insisted on dialogue with the West."

U.S. foreign policy 
He has asked for a boycott of American products.

This boycott should become an overwhelming trend that makes these two states feel that their economies are in a real and actual danger.))

In November 2007, Fadlallah accused the United States of trying to sabotage the election in Lebanon: "The insanity of the U.S. president and its administration is reflected in Lebanon by their ambassador pressuring the Lebanese people and preventing them from reaching an agreement over the presidential election."

Though he welcomed the election of Barack Obama as the American president, the following year he expressed disappointment with Obama's lack of progress in the Middle East peace process saying he appeared to have no plan to bring peace to the region.

9/11 criticism 
Despite his criticism of U.S. foreign policy in the Middle East, he condemned the September 11 attacks in the United States as acts of terrorism.

Israel
Fadlallah made statements in favour of suicide bombings against Israeli citizens. In a 2002 interview with The Daily Telegraph, he said:  
 

His support for suicide bombings against Israel were based on the grounds that the latter uses advanced weaponry; it was also claimed that he wished that the state of Israel would cease to exist.   
    
Following the Mercaz HaRav massacre, Fadlallah called the attack "heroic." Western sources also cite his favour for suicide bombings against Israeli citizens. Fadlallah explained the religious basis for suicide attacks in an interview with Daily Star.

In September 2009, Fadlallah issued a fatwa banning normalisation of ties with Israel. He also objected to any territorial settlement, saying "the entire land of Palestine within its historical borders is one Arab-Islamic country and no one has right to spare on[e] inch of it." Another English translation (from the Arabic in Al Akhbar) was given in The Daily Middle East Reporter.

Islamic governance
Despite his ties with the Islamic Republic of Iran, Fadlallah distanced himself from the Ayatollah Khomeini's legacy of Veleyat-e Faqih as theocratic rule by Islamic clerics was said to argue that "no Shia religious leader, not even Khomeini… has a monopoly on the truth." He also first endorsed Grand Ayatollah Ali al-Sistani rather than Ayatollah Ali Khamenei as the marja for Shia in matters of religion, before claiming the role for himself. In a 2009 interview, Fadlallah said that he did not believe wilayat al-faqih has a role in modern Lebanon.

Women 
Fadlallah was known for his relatively liberal views on women, whom he sees as equal to men. He believed that women have just as much of a responsibility towards society as men do, and women should be role models for both men and women. Fadlallah also believed that women have the same exact ability as men to fight their inner weaknesses. He saw the hijab as something that makes a man see a woman not as a sex object, but instead as a human being. He believes, like all of his peers in the Islamic seminary that women should cover their entire body except for their face and hands, and that they should avoid wearing excessive makeup when they go out in public.

Fadlallah also issued a fatwa on the International Day for the Elimination of Violence against Women that supports the right of a woman to defend herself against any act of violence whether social or physical. The fatwa reaffirms the rights of women, both at their workplace and at home, and states that Islam forbids men from exercising any form of violence against women and forbids men from depriving women of their legal rights. In his words "physical violence in which women are beaten, proves that these men are weak, for only the weak are in need of unjust violence". He also issued fatwas forbidding female circumcision and honour killings.

Abortion 
He was opposed to abortion in most cases; however, when the women is in an abnormal amount of danger by the pregnancy, he believed it was permissible.

Amman Message
He was one of the Ulama signatories of the Amman Message, which gives a broad foundation for defining Muslim orthodoxy.

Controversial views regarding Islamic doctrine
Fadlallah held controversial views regarding Islamic doctrine, as espoused in some of his works and speeches. He also issued many fatwas and opinions that courted controversy, for which he was condemned and not supported by other eminent Islamic scholars, including a representative of Grand Ayatollah al-Sistani, the office of Grand Ayatollah Mirza Jawad Tabrizi, in the holy city of Qom, released a statement that "any help to or cooperation with him in publishing his writings is not legal with respect to Islam". He was also condemned by Grand Ayatollahs Bashir al-Najafi, Hossein Waheed Khorasani, Mohammad al-Husayni al-Shirazi, Sadiq Hussaini Shirazi and others.

Social work 

Fadlallah was quoted as saying, "We have to improve our education and gain more scientific knowledge. If we do not make the best of our time now, we will not be able to build our future or develop in the future." In addition to the academic work that Fadlallah did, he also opened up schools, Islamic centres, and orphanages:

Schools 
 The Imam Al-Khoei Orphanage, Beirut (Dawha)
 Imam Al-Baqir Secondary school, Beka`a (Hirmil)
 Imam Al-Jawed Secondary school, Beka`a (Ali Nahri)
 Imam Ali Bin Abi Talib school, South Lebanon (Ma`roub)
 Imam Hassan Secondary school, Beirut (Ruwais)
 Al-Mujtaba Secondary School, Beirut (Hay Al-Salum)
 Imam Ja`afar As-Sadiq school, South Lebanon (Jwaya)
 Al-Kauther Secondary school, Beirut (Bir Hassan)
 Imam Hussein School, Beka`a (Suh`mour), under construction
 Ali Al-Akbar Vocational Institute Beirut (Doha)

Islamic centres 
 The large Islamic Center, Beirut (Haret Hreik)Consists of the Al-Imamain Hassnian Mosque, the Zah`ra Hall and the Islamic Cultural Center.
 Imam Hasan Askari Center Beka`a'(Sira'in)
 Imam Hussein Center-Beka`a(Jlala)
 Imam Ali Bin Abi Talib center South Lebanon.(AL-Hawzah-Sour)
 Ahl Al-Beit Mosque Beka`a' (Rayak)
 Imam Ja'far Al-Sadiq Mosque Beka`a (Hirmil)
 Ahl Al-Beit Center, North Lebanon (Tripoli)
 Sayyida Zaynab Mosque, Beka`a (Baalbeck)

Orphanages 
 Imam Al-Khoei Orphanage (Beirut-Doha)
 Imam Zein Al-Abidine (A.S.) Orphanage Biqaa(Hirmil).
 Imam Ali Bin Abi Talib (A.S.) Orphanage, South Lebanon. (The Ma`roub-Sour road)
 Virgin Mary Orphanage (A.S.) South Lebanon(Jiwaya).
 Al- Sayyida Khadijah Al-Kubraa (A.S.) Orphanage, Beirut (Bir-Hassan).
 The Zaynab (A.S.) Orphanage West Biqaa (Suh`mour) Under construction.

Death

Fadlallah was hospitalized several times in the months before his death, suffering from internal bleeding. His frailty prevented him from delivering Friday sermons in the weeks preceding his death. Fadlallah's media office announced his death at Al-Hassanein Mosque in the southern Beirut suburb of Haret Hureik on 4 July 2010. He was 74. His office said the funeral was scheduled for 6 July at 13:30 p.m. leaving from his house, his burial to be in Al-Hasanein Mosque. His family received condolences at the mosque.

The day was also declared by Lebanon as a day of national mourning. The cabinet's General Secretariat said all public institutions and administrations, headquarters of municipalities, private and public schools and universities would be closed. The Lebanese flag would be lowered to half-mast in public institutions and administration and the headquarters of municipalities. Radio and television programmes would also be "adjusted in line with the painful occasion."

At his funeral, his supporters carried his body around Shia neighbourhoods in southern Beirut, then marched to the spot of his 1985 assassination attempt before returning to Imam Rida Mosque, where he was laid to rest. Thousands of mourners gathered at the mosque for prayer services before the funeral procession. Delegations included representatives from Kuwait, Bahrain, Qatar, Syria and Iran. Thousands of his followers also gathered outside his mosque in Haret Hreik. Al-Manar broadcast the funeral. They said thousands of his followers took part in his funeral and told "his eminence for the last time their 'own secrets' and vowing to stay committed to his path. They told him that even if he has died, he will remain the ideal and the model for them, that even if he has died, his eminence will remain a great man in the eyes of all those who had the chance to know him, and his views will continue to circulate from one generation to another". Al-Manar said his followers "launched a school of beliefs and thoughts, a school that would always be committed to the main causes of Islam, from Jihad to Resistance, and face all foreign threats against the region." It claimed that Fadlallah "committed to the central cause, Palestine, calling to fight occupation through all possible means. His eminence issued different 'fatwa's calling to fight Israel and boycott American goods and ban normalizing of relations, and was a 'true supporter' of Islamic unity all over his life. In his last moments before his death, Sayyed Fadlullah was still preoccupied with the cause. He was asking about the dawn prayers and telling his nurse that he wouldn't rest before Israel's vanishing."

Reactions
 Prime Minister of Lebanon Saad Hariri, called him "a voice of moderation and an advocate of unity" for the Lebanese people. Hezbollah declared three days of mourning and Secretary General Hasan Nasrallah vowed to stay faithful to the "sacred goals" he had "sacrificed his life to achieve." He added that "we have lost a compassionate father, a wise guide, a fortified shelter, and a strong support that was present at all stages. [He] was all the above mentioned for us and for the whole religious and resistant generation since we were youngsters praying behind him. This is what his eminence was to us, and to all this faithful, struggling, and resisting generation, since the time we were youths praying in his assembly (congregational prayers), guided by his words, and learning beneath his pulpit. In his school, he taught us to advocate with wisdom and kind preaching, to be people of dialogue with others, to reject tyranny, to resist occupation, to adore meeting God the Almighty with certitude, and to be people of patience, steadfastness, and determination even with all the calamities, hardships, and distress we face. To us, he was the teacher, instructor, the knowledge, and the light that lights up our way through every hardship. His pure soul, enlightened intellect, kind words, compassionate smile, chaste biography, and firm stances will remain within us as a guide, conduit, and progressing strong motive that pushes us forth to continuous hard work and jihad." He visited Fadlallah's family to express condolences on behalf of Hezbollah. The Loyalty to the Resistance bloc offered its condolences to the country adding that the country "loyal to his eminence's values and principles would continue his path with more enthusiasm to achieve his human goals of freedom and justice." The Lebanese Speaker of Parliament Nabih Berri said the Islamic nation has lost "a leading advocate of Muslim unity and a resounding voice supporting what is right and just, and resisting injustice and aggression". He praised Fadlallah as one of the most prominent pillars of coexistence among cultures and religions in Lebanon, calling him a "backer of the resistance until his last breath". A delegation from his parliamentary Liberation and Development parliamentary bloc also visited the clerics' family. Phalange leader Amin Gemayel and a delegation of his party's MPs, former Premier and Sidon MP Fouad Siniora, the Syrian Ambassador to Lebanon Ali Abdel-Karim, Lebanese Army commander General Jean Kahwaji, head of the Free Patriotic Movement and Kesrouan MP Michel Aoun, accompanied by a delegation from his Change and Reform bloc and Beirut Metropolitan for Greek Orthodox Bishop Elias Audi, heading a number of religious figures. paid their respects at Fadlallah's death as well. Fadlallah's followers remembered him fondly for his compassion, his support of women's rights, and his teachings on topics such as sex and smoking. The day after the funeral Mufti Mohamad Rashid Qabbani, former Prime Minister Omar Karame, the head of the Marada movement Suleiman Franjieh, former Iraqi Prime Ministers Ibrahim Jaafari and Iyad Allawi, the head of the Lebanese Democratic Movement Talal Arslan, the Egyptian ambassador Ahmad Badyawi, MP's Gebran Bassil, Ibrahim Najjar, Salim Warde, and George Odwan came to the mosque to offer their condolences. Additional visitors included Ali al-Adib on behalf of Iraqi Prime Minister Nouri al-Maliki, Sami al-Jawad representing former Speaker Kamel al-Asaad, Director General of Internal Security Forces Major General Ashraf Rifi, Bishop Elias Kfouri. Nasrallah also received the Grand Mufti of the Lebanese Republic Sheikh Mohammad Rashid Qabbani who offered his condolences. A statement released by Hezbollah said the two discussed Fadlallah's "glorious deeds and the big loss caused by his death to Lebanon and the nation." Although representatives of Shia, Sunni, Druze, Christian, and other non-religious figures expressed regret at Fadlullah's death, the conspicuous absence of Maronite Patriarch Nasrallah Sfeir was viewed as a "boycott" by Al-Akhbar, because of Fadlallah's response to Sfeir's comments about the rule of the majority and the opposition of the minority in Lebanon.
Al Manar had its own tribute for him saying "Dubbed by the media as the "Spiritual Leader" of the Islamic resistance "Hezbollah", in Lebanon, Ayatollah Mohammed Hussein Fadlullah inspired the leaders for the resistance group, and served as a highly influential beacon of truth for all the oppressed peoples of the world." Adding that "Fadlullah was not only a Muslim reference and authority but rather one of the most prominent contemporary religious authorities in the Islamic World. His great experience in teaching jurisprudence as well as his constant monitoring of the latest trends and literature of the major religious schools have enabled him to launch his own school and to be followed by thousands of Muslim believers in Lebanon and the region". They added that Fadlallah united Lebanon after his death, saying he was "able to deliver a message of unity and peace to all Lebanese, a message of commitment to all values and principles, at the top of which comes the recognition of the patriots. Through his sorrowful death, Grand Ayatollah Sayyed Mohamad Hussein Fadlullah accomplished his mission and joined Lebanese, all Lebanese regardless of their identities and sects, around him. With his sad death, Ayatollah Sayyed Fadlullah made the headlines in Lebanon and the region as his lovers and supporters were unable to believe that this great man has actually passed away." Other media outlets in Lebanon also offered tributes to Fadlallah. Assafir noted the religious diversity of people at his funeral as well delegations from Syria, Iran, United Arab Emirates, Jordan, Iraq, Palestine, Saudi Arabia, Kuwait, Bahrain, and other countries that were present. Al-Liwa, Asharq, and Addiyar also had headline articles on his death.
His family thanked Hezbollah's Secretary General and leadership for the consolations they expressed.
The Organisation of the Islamic Conference issued a statement lamenting the death with great affection and sorrow. "Sayyed Fadlullah's death represents a great death to the Islamic nation, where he lived loyal in serving his country and his nation's issues, presenting a symbol in rapprochement between sects. With his death, the Islamic nation loses one of the most prominent Islamic figures, who played a great role in supporting the Islamic solidarity."
 King Hamad bin Isa Al Khalifa also sent his to Fadlallah's family expressing his sincere condolences to the family, and prayed for the Fadlallah's soul to rest in eternal peace. He also praised Fadlullah's scientific and religious contributions in the service of Islam and Muslims.
 In Iraq, Ali al-Adeeb, a senior member of the Dawa party, called his death a major loss to the Islamic world adding that: "It will be hard to replace him". In Fadlallah's birthplace, however, his death was met with a chilly reception without banners or open displays of mourning as clergy in Najaf expressed discomfort over his legacy and liberal values.
 The Supreme Leader of Iran Ali Khamenei cabled his condolences to Fadlullah's family and his supporters saying "This great intellectual and Mujahid had a huge impact and influence in the political and religious scenes in Lebanon. We won't forget his numerous favors and blessings throughout the years. Sayyed Fadlullah was loyal to the path of the Islamic Revolution and proved this through words and actions throughout the Islamic Republic's thirty years." The Chairman of the Expediency Discernment Council of Iran. Ali Akbar Hashemi Rafsanjani said Fadlallah was an ideal fit to the Hadith that says "The death of a religious scholar causes such a void in Islam that nothing can fill up." Adding that he was an ideal struggler scholar, and the number of assassination attempts he faced for his path are the biggest honour. President Mahmoud Ahmadinejad expressed his condolences to Lebanese President Michel Suleiman saying "The brilliant and valuable service of the honourable cleric for national unity and his perseverance with the resistance will live on in the history of Lebanon." Foreign Minister Manouchehr Mottaki sent his condolences to Lebanese officials such as Hasan Nasrallah, Nabih Berri, his Lebanese counterpart Ali Shami, and Fadlallah's son, Ali Fadlallah, expressing his condolences to the Lebanese government and people, as well as to Fadlallah's family. Parliamentary Speaker Ali Larijani issued a statement emphasizing that Fadlallah "spent his blessed life in favor of Islam and the Lebanese people," while noting that he used to observe situations with a critical view and bright mind, while enlightening Muslims at the right times, he also used to build an obstacle for the enemy. An Iranian delegation headed by Ayatollah Ahmad Jannati was present for the funeral.
 An Israeli spokesman said Ayatollah Fadlallah was "unworthy of praise". They also criticised Britain's ambassador to Lebanon for eulogising him.
 Emir Sabah Al-Ahmad Al-Jaber Al-Sabah also sent his condolences to the family of Fadlallah saying he prayed to Almighty Allah to have mercy on the soul of the deceased. National Assembly Speaker Jassem Mohammed Al-Khorafi also sent a cable of condolences to his Lebanese counterpart consoling him on the death of Fadlallah. Al-Khorafi expressed his heartfelt sorrow at the news, asking God to have mercy on the soul of the deceased. He also sent a similar cable to the family of Fadlullah.
 President Mahmoud Abbas sent his condolences to his Lebanese counterpart. The head of Hamas' Political Bureau, Khaled Meshaal, sent a letter to Fadlallah's son lamenting the loss of his father. "The dear deceased was one of the nation's special and great figures, with his knowledge, grace, moderation, mediation, forgiveness and openness to others, in addition to his courageous stances regarding the nation's issues, especially towards the Palestinian issue and the Arab-Zionist struggle. His eminence was one of the greatest symbols and scholars defending the choice of resistance and Jihad against the occupation, in support of the Palestinian strife and our people's right to freedom, liberty and liberation." An Hamas delegation from Gaza headed by Marwan Abu Ras was also present at the funerary services.
 Emir Hamad bin Khalifa Al Thani offered condolences to the Lebanese people on behalf of Qatar, its Emir, government and people. Upon arrival in Beirut, al-Thani praised the "commendable attributes of Fadlallah and his relentless efforts in seeking rapprochement and conciliation among various Muslim sects."
 Saudi Arabia sent a delegation for the funeral.
 Prime Minister Recep Tayyip Erdogan called Hezbollah leader Sayyed Hassan Nasrallah to offer his condolences and asked to relay them to Fadlallah's family and the Lebanese people. Nasrallah responded in appreciation and for Erdogan's stance on the Palestinian issue.
 The British ambassador to Lebanon, Frances Guy, also wrote: "I remember well, when I was nominated ambassador to Beirut, a Muslim acquaintance sought me out to tell me how lucky I was because I would get a chance to meet Sayyed Mohamad Hussein Fadlullah. Truly he was right...I usually avoid answering by referring to those I enjoy meeting the most and those that impress me the most. Until yesterday my preferred answer was to refer to Sayyed Mohamad Hussein Fadlullah. When you visited him you could be sure of a real debate, a respectful argument and you knew you would leave his presence feeling a better person. That for me is the real effect of a true man of religion; leaving an impact on everyone he meets, no matter what their faith...Lebanon is a lesser place the day after but his absence will be felt well beyond Lebanon's shores. If I was sad to hear the news I know other peoples' lives will be truly blighted. The world needs more men like him willing to reach out across faiths, acknowledging the reality of the modern world and daring to confront old constraints." The UK foreign office said it had taken down the message after "mature consideration." They also added that "the ambassador expressed a personal view on Shiekh Sayyid Mohammad Hussein Fadlallah describing the man as she knew him. We welcomed his progressive views on women's rights and interfaith dialogue but there were also areas where we had profound disagreements, especially over his statements advocating attacks on Israel."
Robert Fisk wrote in The Independent "I do believe that Fadlallah was a very serious and very important man whose constant sermons on the need for spiritual regeneration and kindness did more good than most in a country constantly flooded in a rhetoric bath. Hundreds of thousands attended his funeral in Beirut on Tuesday. I am not surprised." The Telegraph's executive foreign editor Con Coughlin wrote an article saying "Don't be fooled by all the tributes that are pouring out following the death in Beirut at the weekend of Sheikh Mohammed Hussein Fadlallah, the so-called spiritual leader of the radical Shi'ite Muslim militia Hizbollah. The U.S. State Department's classification of Fadlallah as a terrorist was spot on, and when you look back at his track record you can see he was right up there with other infamous terror masterminds, such as Abu Nidal and Carlos the Jackal."
 President Ali Abdullah Saleh also sent his condolences to his Lebanese counterpart.
CNN's Lebanese senior editor of Middle East affairs Octavia Nasr was fired after a tweet saying she was "Sad to hear of the passing of Sayyed Mohammed Hussein Fadlallah...One of Hezbollah's giants I respect[ed] a lot." Hezbollah condemned her dismissal. Robert Fisk criticised CNN for the firing saying "Poor old CNN goes on getting more cowardly by the hour. That's why no one cares about it any more."

See also 
 Ayatollah Mohammed Baqir al-Hakim, maternal cousin of Ayatollah Mohammad Hussein Fadlallah.
 Pope Shenouda III of Alexandria

References

Sources 
Kramer, Martin (1997), "The Oracle of Hizbullah: Sayyid Muhammad Husayn Fadlallah". Full Text with footnotes published in Appleby, R. Scott, Spokesmen for the Despised: Fundamentalist Leaders in the Middle East, pp. 83-181, Chicago, University of Chicago Press (1997), ISBN 978-0-226-02125-6

Ranstorp, Magnus, Hizb'allah in Lebanon - The Politics of the Western Hostage Crisis, Palgrave Macmillan,1997

External links

  Official Website (Arabic, English, French, Persian)
  Official Website (Persian, Urdu)
  The Oracle of Hizbullah: Sayyid Muhammad Husayn Fadlallah by Martin Kramer
 Sayyed Fadlullah's Funeral… in Photos
 On the Death of the Grand Ayatollah Fadlallah: "Religion Serves the People"

1935 births
2010 deaths
People from Najaf
20th-century Lebanese politicians
Lebanese grand ayatollahs
Hezbollah members
Bazzi family
Twelvers
Islamic Dawa Party
Survivors of terrorist attacks